Michael James Burry (born June 19, 1971) is an American investor, hedge fund manager, and physician. He founded the hedge fund Scion Capital, which he ran from 2000 until 2008 before closing it to focus on his personal investments. He is best known for being amongst the first investors to predict and profit from the subprime mortgage crisis that occurred between 2007 and 2010.

Early life and education
Burry was born and grew up in San Jose, California. He has Rusyn ancestry. At the age of two he lost his left eye to retinoblastoma and has had a prosthetic eye ever since. As a teenager, he attended Santa Teresa High School.

He studied economics and pre-med at the University of California, Los Angeles, earned an MD degree from the Vanderbilt University School of Medicine, and started but did not finish his residency in pathology at Stanford University Medical Center. While off duty at night, he worked on his hobby: financial investing.

Despite not practicing, Burry has kept his license as a physician active with the Medical Board of California, including continuing education requirements.

Investment career
After medical school, Burry worked as a Stanford Hospital neurology resident, then a Stanford Hospital pathology resident.

He then left to start his own hedge fund. He had already developed a reputation as an investor by demonstrating success in value investing, which he wrote about on message boards on the stock discussion site Silicon Investor beginning in 1996. He was so successful with his stock picks that he attracted the interest of companies such as Vanguard, White Mountains Insurance Group and prominent investors such as Joel Greenblatt. Burry has a strictly traditional understanding of value. He has said more than once that his investment style is built upon Benjamin Graham and David Dodd’s 1934 book Security Analysis: "All my stock picking is 100% based on the concept of a margin of safety."

After shutting down his website in November 2000, Burry started the hedge fund Scion Capital, funded by an inheritance and loans from his family. He named it after Terry Brooks' The Scions of Shannara (1990), one of his favorite novels. He quickly earned extraordinary profits for his investors. According to author Michael Lewis, "in his first full year, 2001, the S&P 500 fell 11.88%. Scion was up 55%. The next year, the S&P 500 fell again, by 22.1%, and Scion was up again: 16%. The next year, 2003, the stock market finally turned around and rose 28.69%, but Burry beat it again, with returns of 50%. By the end of 2004, he was managing $600 million and turning money away." Burry was able to achieve these returns partly by shorting overvalued tech stocks at the peak of the internet bubble.

In 2005, Burry started to focus on the subprime market. Through his analysis of mortgage lending practices in 2003 and 2004, he correctly predicted that the real estate bubble would collapse as early as 2007. His research on the values of residential real estate convinced him that subprime mortgages, especially those with "teaser" rates, and the bonds based on these mortgages, would begin losing value when the original rates were replaced by much higher rates, often in as little as two years after initiation. This conclusion led him to short the market by persuading Goldman Sachs and other investment firms to sell him credit default swaps against subprime deals he saw as vulnerable.

During his payments toward the credit default swaps, Burry suffered an investor revolt, where some investors in his fund worried his predictions were inaccurate and demanded to withdraw their capital. Eventually, Burry's analysis proved correct: He made a personal profit of $100 million and a profit for his remaining investors of more than $700 million. Scion Capital ultimately recorded returns of 489.34% (net of fees and expenses) between its November 1, 2000 inception and June 2008. The S&P 500, widely regarded as the benchmark for the US market, returned just under 3%, including dividends over the same period.

According to his website, Burry liquidated his credit default swap short positions by April 2008 and did not benefit from the bailouts of 2008 and 2009. He subsequently liquidated his company to focus on his personal investments.

In an April 3, 2010 op-ed for The New York Times, Burry argued that anyone who studied the financial markets carefully in 2003, 2004 and 2005 could have recognized the growing risk in the subprime markets. He faulted federal regulators for failing to listen to warnings from outside a closed circle of advisors.

In 2013, Burry reopened his hedge fund, this time called Scion Asset Management, filing reports as an exempt reporting adviser (ERA) active in the state of California and approved by the SEC. He has focused much of his attention on investing in water, gold, and farm land. He has said, "Fresh, clean water cannot be taken for granted. And it is not—water is political, and litigious."

Glimpses were offered into Scion's portfolio with 13Fs filed from the 4th quarter of 2015 through the 3rd quarter of 2016, as required by the SEC when fund holdings top $100 million. After more than two years, on February 14, 2019, Scion Asset Management filed another 13F, showing Burry to hold numerous large-cap stocks and $103,528,000 13F assets under management, just above the threshold for filing. In August 2019, Bloomberg News quoted an email from Burry where he said there was a bubble in large US company stocks due to the popularity of passive investing, which "has orphaned smaller value-type securities globally". In 2020, the fund's largest investments were Alphabet Inc. ($121 million value) and Facebook ($24.4 million value).

Burry initiated short position(s) on Tesla before or around early December 2020, according to a now-deleted tweet and likely added to his short positions after the market cap of Tesla surpassed that of Facebook. Burry predicted Tesla stock would collapse like the housing bubble, saying that "my last Big Short got bigger and Bigger and BIGGER" and taunted Tesla bulls to 'enjoy it while it lasts.' In May 2021, it was reported that he held puts on over 800,000 shares of Tesla. In October 2021, after a 100% rise in Tesla's stock value, he revealed he was no longer shorting it. During the second quarter of 2021, he has reported to hold puts on almost 31 million dollars on the ARKK ETF innovation index managed by Ark Invest.

Personal life
Burry is married, with children, and was living in Saratoga, California in 2010. His son was diagnosed with Asperger syndrome, and Burry believes he himself has Asperger syndrome after reading about the disorder. When he was younger, he noticed that it took him a lot of energy to look people in the eye, and said, "If I am looking at you, that's the one time I know I won't be listening to you". 

He is a fan of heavy metal music, including bands such as Obituary, Lamb of God, Amon Amarth, Slipknot, King Diamond and Pantera.

Burry was highly critical of the lockdowns during the COVID-19 pandemic in the United States.

In popular culture

Film
 Burry is portrayed by Christian Bale in the 2015 film The Big Short.

Literature 
 2010: Michael Lewis, The Big Short
 2009: Gregory Zuckerman, The Greatest Trade Ever

References

External links
 "Michael Burry: Subprime Short-Seller No. 1," , The New York Times, March 1, 2010
"Betting on the Blind Side" Excerpt from "The Big Short"
 "A Primer on Scion Capital’s Subprime Mortgage Short", Michael Burry, M.D. November 7, 2006
 "Michael Burry’s FCIC Testimony – Audio", FCIC Staff Audiotape of Interview with Michael Burry
 "Scion Asset Management - Homepage"
 "Scion Asset Management - Quarterly Holdings Reports"

1971 births
American financiers
American hedge fund managers
American investors
American money managers
American stock traders
Businesspeople from California
Living people
People from Saratoga, California
Physicians from California
Santa Teresa High School alumni
University of California, Los Angeles alumni
Vanderbilt University School of Medicine alumni